Carter Glass Memorial Bridge crosses the James River between the independent city of Lynchburg and Amherst County, Virginia, Lynchburg Expressway. The bridge carries U.S. Route 29 Business (US 29 Bus.), and it was named in 1949 in honor of former U.S. Senator Carter Glass (1858–1946) of Lynchburg. The bridge was constructed in 1953–1954.

See also
 
 
 
 List of crossings of the James River

References

Bridges completed in 1954
Buildings and structures in Lynchburg, Virginia
Buildings and structures in Amherst County, Virginia
Bridges over the James River (Virginia)
Transportation in Lynchburg, Virginia
Transportation in Amherst County, Virginia
Road bridges in Virginia
U.S. Route 29
Bridges of the United States Numbered Highway System
1954 establishments in Virginia